This is a list of members of the Tasmanian Legislative Council between 2017 and 2023. Terms of the Legislative Council did not coincide with Legislative Assembly elections, and members served six year terms, with a number of members facing election each year.

Elections

Members 

 On 5 August 2017, new electoral boundaries came into effect which abolished the seats of  Apsley and Western Tiers. The members for those divisions, Tania Rattray and Greg Hall, were both allocated the new seat of McIntyre until the expiry of Hall's term in April 2018.
 Pembroke Liberal MLC Vanessa Goodwin resigned due to terminal cancer on 2 October 2017. Labor candidate Jo Siejka won the resulting by-election on 4 November.
 Liberal candidate Jane Howlett won the new seat of Prosser at the 2018 Tasmanian Legislative Council periodic election, while incumbent independent Hobart MLC Rob Valentine was re-elected.
 Independent candidate Meg Webb won the seat of Nelson at the 2019 Tasmanian Legislative Council periodic election, while Labor MLC Jo Siejka (Pembroke) and Liberal MLC Leonie Hiscutt (Montgomery) were re-elected.
 At the 2020 Tasmanian Legislative Council periodic election, Liberal candidate Jo Palmer replaced retiring independent MLC Kerry Finch in Rosevears, while Labor candidate Bastian Seidel defeated incumbent independent MLC Robert Armstrong in Huon.
 At the 2021 Tasmanian Legislative Council periodic election, Liberal candidate Nick Duigan replaced retiring independent MLC Ivan Dean in Windermere, while Labor candidate Craig Farrell (Derwent) was re-elected.
 On 23 August 2021, Labor MLC Bastian Seidel resigned from the Labor caucus and resigned from the Legislative Council in January 2022. At the by-election held on 7 May 2022, Independent candidate Dean Harriss was elected.
 On 2 August 2022, Labor MLC for Pembroke Jo Siejka  resigned from the Legislative Council. At the by-election held on 10 September 2022, Labor candidate Luke Edmunds was elected.

Sources
 Parliament of Tasmania (2006). The Parliament of Tasmania from 1856

Members of Tasmanian parliaments by term
21st-century Australian politicians